This is a list of covers of issues of TV Guide magazine for the decade of the 1960s, from January 1960 to December 1969.  The entries on this table include each cover's subjects and their artists (photographer or illustrator). This list is for the regular weekly issues of TV Guide; any one-time-only special issues are not included.

1960

1961

1962

1963

1964

1965

1966

1967

1968

1969

Sources
Covers and table of contents page descriptions for the various issues.
TV Guide cover archive website: 1960s
TV Guide: Fifty Years of Television, New York, NY: Crown Publishers, 2002. 
Stephen Hofer, ed., TV Guide: The Official Collectors Guide, Braintree, Mass.: BangZoom Publishers, 2006.  .
"50 Greatest TV Guide Covers," article from the June 15, 2002 edition of TV Guide
Information from ellwanger.tv's TV Guide collection section

Covers
1960s in American television
1960s television-related lists
TV Guide